Stephen Shea (born December 21, 1961, in Los Angeles, California) is a former child actor most noted for voicing the character of Linus van Pelt (inheriting the role from his older brother, Christopher) in seven animated Peanuts television specials (Play It Again, Charlie Brown; You're Not Elected, Charlie Brown; There's No Time for Love, Charlie Brown; A Charlie Brown Thanksgiving; It's a Mystery, Charlie Brown; It's the Easter Beagle, Charlie Brown; and Be My Valentine, Charlie Brown), and in the feature-length animated film Snoopy Come Home. Stephen is also the brother of actor Eric Shea.

Filmography

As the voice of "Linus"

Other roles

External links
 

Living people
1961 births
Male actors from Los Angeles
American male child actors